Turn Me Loose may refer to:

Music

Albums
Turn Me Loose (Ledisi album)
Turn Me Loose (Vince Gill album)
Turn Me Loose, album by Steve Jordan (accordionist) 	1986

Songs
"Turn Me Loose" (Loverboy song), also covered by Young Divas
"Turn Me Loose" (Fabian song)
"Turn Me Loose", a song by Rock Goddess from the album Young and Free
"Turn Me Loose", a song by Madcon from the album Conquest